Boyd County High School (BCHS) is a public high school in Ashland, Kentucky, United States. It is part of the Boyd County Public Schools district.

It is an affiliate school of the Gilder Lehrman Institute of American History and home to one of only two Rho Kappa National Social Studies Honor Society chapters in Eastern Kentucky. That chapter's online Digital Humanities Center is currently developing the Kentucky Humanities & Social Sciences Degree Index.

October 22, 2010, ground was broke for this high school. The building was dedicated December 13, 2012 and students arrived in January 2013.

The former high school is now used for other activities, and is at 12307 Midland Trail Rd, Ashland KY 41102. It is called Boyd County Public Schools Heritage Building.

References

External links 
 

Schools in Boyd County, Kentucky
Public high schools in Kentucky
Ashland, Kentucky